Édson (Brazilian Portuguese: [ˈɛtsõ]) is a Brazilian name, often spelled Edson.

The name is found as early as the 1920s, for example in the name of the businessman Edson Queiroz. The most famous holder of the name is the footballer Pelé, born Edson Arantes do Nascimento, although his name given as Edison on his birth certificate. The name "Édson" alone has been taken as a mononym by many Brazilian footballers, but most notably Édson Boaro (1959) from the 1986 World Cup squad.

People
People with the name include:
 Edson (footballer, born 1977), Brazilian footballer playing for Korona Kielce
 Édson (footballer, born 1984), Guinea-Bissauan footballer 
 Édson (footballer, born 1985), Brazilian footballer
 Edson (footballer, born 1987), Brazilian footballer
 Edson (footballer, born 1990), Brazilian footballer
 Edson (footballer, born 1991), Brazilian footballer
 Edson (footballer, born 1998), Brazilian footballer
 Edson Arantes do Nascimento (1940–2022), Brazilian footballer known as Pelé
 Edson Araújo (born 1980), Brazilian footballer
 Edson Barboza (born 1986), Brazilian-American mixed martial artist
 Édson Bastos (born 1979), Brazilian footballer
 Edson Bindilatti (born 1979), Brazilian decathlete and bobsledder
 Édson Boaro (born 1959), Brazilian footballer
 Edson Cariús (born 1988), Brazilian footballer
 Édson Di (born 1979), Brazilian footballer
 Edson Gaúcho (born 1955), Brazilian footballer
 Édson Nobre (born 1980), Angolan footballer
 Edson Paraíba (born 1992), Brazilian footballer
 Edson Pinheiro (born 1979), Brazilian Paralympic athlete
 Edson Ratinho (born 1986), Brazilian footballer
 Édson Ribeiro (born 1972), Brazilian sprinter
 Edson Silva (footballer, born 1986), Brazilian footballer
 Edson Sitta, Brazilian footballer
 Edson Tavares, Brazilian football manager

References

Portuguese masculine given names